Checkpost is a 1974 Indian Malayalam-language film, directed and produced by J. D. Thottan. The film stars Sathyan, Adoor Bhasi, Thikkurissy Sukumaran Nair and Muthukulam Raghavan Pillai. The film had musical score by P. S. Divakar.

Cast

Sathyan
Adoor Bhasi
Thikkurissy Sukumaran Nair
Muthukulam Raghavan Pillai
Pattom Sadan
Ambika
Bahadoor
Kamaladevi
Kottarakkara Sreedharan Nair
S. P. Pillai
Sadhana
Shailasree
Ushanandini

Soundtrack
The music was composed by P. S. Divakar and the lyrics were written by P. Bhaskaran.

References

External links
 

1974 films
1970s Malayalam-language films
Films directed by J. D. Thottan